"Closer" is a song written and performed by Christian rock act Jars of Clay. The radio single was released in promotion of the band's 2008-released EP, Closer. Although the track also appears on the band's 2009 album The Long Fall Back to Earth, the single was released far in advance of its announcement and release to be considered that album's first single. The version of the song that appears on The Long Fall Back to Earth is a different mix than the one that appears on the Closer EP, containing a longer intro and song length. "Closer" was co-produced by Ron Aniello, who also helped co-produce the band's 2003 release Who We Are Instead and helped co-write a handful of tracks from their Good Monsters studio album.

Track listing
"Closer" – 3:39 (Dan Haseltine, Charlie Lowell, Stephen Mason, Matt Odmark)

Performance credits
Dan Haseltine – vocals
Charlie Lowell – piano, organ
Stephen Mason – guitars
Matt Odmark – guitars
Gabe Ruschival – bass
Jeremy Lutito – drums, percussion

Technical credits
Jars of Clay – producer
Ron Aniello – producer
Mitch Dane – engineering
Joshua V. Smith – engineering assistant
Jay Ruston – mixing
Spike – mixing assistant
Stephen Marsh – mastering

2008 singles
Jars of Clay songs
Songs written by Dan Haseltine
Songs written by Charlie Lowell
Songs written by Stephen Mason (musician)
Songs written by Matt Odmark
Song recordings produced by Ron Aniello
2008 songs
Essential Records (Christian) singles